Giuseppe "Bepi" Moro (16 January 1921 – 28 January 1974) was an Italian footballer who played as a goalkeeper. An eccentric and athletic player, who was also an excellent shot-stopper, he is regarded as one of Italy's most spectacular keepers of all time; he was also known for his penalty–stopping abilities: with 16 saves in 270 appearances between 1947 and 1955, he has stopped the fifth–highest number of penalties in Serie A, alongside Gianluigi Buffon.

Club career
In eight season in Serie A, Giuseppe Moro defended the goal of six different teams: Fiorentina, Bari, Torino, Lucchese, Sampdoria and Roma.

International career
Moro made his debut with the Italy national team in 1949, producing some notable saves against Hungary. During his second appearance, in a classic England–Italy match played in London, he showcased his best-known block: Stan Mortensen tried to get past Moro with a powerful and accurate shot which the Italian goalkeeper brilliantly denied. Moro kept a clean sheet for 75 minutes, before giving up goals to Jack Rowley and Billy Wright, which did not diminish his outstanding performance.

He also appeared with Italy in the 1950 World Cup in a win against Paraguay, replacing the first-choice goalkeeper Lucidio Sentimenti, who had played the two previous matches.

References

External links
 
 

1921 births
1974 deaths
Italian footballers
Association football goalkeepers
A.S. Roma players
U.C. Sampdoria players
ACF Fiorentina players
Treviso F.B.C. 1993 players
U.S. Alessandria Calcio 1912 players
S.S.C. Bari players
Torino F.C. players
S.S.D. Lucchese 1905 players
Hellas Verona F.C. players
Serie A players
Italy international footballers
1950 FIFA World Cup players